Katie A. Keane (also known as Katie Amanda Keane) is an American actress.

Career
Keane received her Bachelor of Fine Arts from Emporia State University in 1996 and a M.F.A. with honors from California State University, Long Beach. In addition to a number of theatrical credits (including performances as Lady Macbeth and Desdemona), she is best known for her role as Audie Gallagher in the television series Ruby & the Rockits. She has also had guest appearances on Passions, Strong Medicine, CSI: NY, How I Met Your Mother, NCIS, Without a Trace, and Eli Stone. She portrays Sarah in the 2010 film My Name Is Khan.

Filmography

References

External links
Official website at ABC

American film actresses
American television actresses
Living people
Emporia State University alumni
California State University, Long Beach alumni
American stage actresses
People from Topeka, Kansas
Year of birth missing (living people)
21st-century American women